Christina McDonald may refer to:

Christina McDonald (gymnast) (born 1969), Canadian gymnast
Christina McDonald (nurse) (1911 - 1986), New Zealand military nurse
Christina McDonald (politician), Canadian New Democratic Party candidate